Playmobil FunPark is the world's second largest Playmobil factory, located in Ħal Far in the extreme south of Malta. It was opened in 2011 and allow people from 2 years to 13 years. 
The Playmobil FunPark encompasses an air-conditioned indoor play area with Princess, Knights and Police themes and divided into two sections – a 1.2.3 baby and toddler area and the 4 + play area with Playmobil play sets and figures with which children can make up their own creative stories and improve cognitive skills.
There is also an outdoor play area that has a Pirate theme where children can play out their fantasies on the pirate ship, slides, bridges, tree house and the water channel – all set up in a safe, friendly and stimulating environment suitable for all the family. Relax and grab a snack at the Cafeteria in the FunPark.
At the Playmobil FunPark Shop, one can find all the latest Playmobil range for toddlers, boys and girls. Toys to suit all growing personalities can be found, ensuring an experience that will keep young ones entertained for hours!
· Indoor & Outdoor Play Area
· Exclusive Playmobil Shop in Malta
· Cafeteria

References

Museums in Malta
Toy museums
Commercial buildings in Malta
Birżebbuġa
Playmobil